The year 717 BC was a year of the pre-Julian Roman calendar. In the Roman Empire, it was known as year 37 Ab urbe condita . The denomination 717 BC for this year has been used since the early medieval period, when the Anno Domini calendar era became the prevalent method in Europe for naming years.

Events
 The Sicilian colony of Chersonesos is established (or 716 BC).
 Assyrian king Sargon conquers the Neo-Hittite stronghold of Carchemish.

Births

Deaths

References

710s BC